The McGuire Sisters were a singing trio in American popular music. The group was composed of three sisters:
 Ruby Christine McGuire (July 30, 1926 – December 28, 2018)
 Dorothy "Dottie" McGuire (February 13, 1928 – September 7, 2012)
 Phyllis Jean McGuire (February 14, 1931 – December 29, 2020)

Among their most popular songs are "Sincerely" and "Sugartime", both number-one hits.

Early years 
The McGuire sisters were born to Asa and Lillie (Fultz) McGuire in Middletown, Ohio, and grew up in Miamisburg near Dayton. Their mother, Lillie, was a minister of the Miamisburg First Church of God, where, as children, they sang in church at weddings, funerals, and revivals. When they started singing in 1935, the youngest sister, Phyllis, was four years old. Eventually, they sang at occasions outside church, and by 1949 were singing at military bases and veterans' hospitals, performing a more diverse repertoire than they had in church.

Career in show business
The McGuire Sisters signed with Coral Records in 1952. In the same year, they appeared on Arthur Godfrey's Talent Scouts, and Godfrey hired them for his other shows, where they remained for seven years. The November 1953 issue of Cosmopolitan called them "Godfrey's Merry McGuires". The sisters often were compared to the Andrews Sisters. Maxene Andrews said in an interview with Joe Franklin on WOR (AM) radio in 1979, "The McGuire Sisters were fine once they stopped imitating the Andrews Sisters." While working on the Godfrey show, the McGuires befriended singer Lu Ann Simms and attended her wedding to music publisher Loring Buzzell in July 1956. Buzzell's music publishing firm, Hecht-Lancaster & Buzzell Music (co-owned by Harold Hecht and Burt Lancaster) provided two songs for the McGuire Sisters, "May You Always", which became the best-selling 45 and sheet music of 1959, and "Theme from The Unforgiven (The Need for Love)", which became another big hit in 1960.

The McGuire Sisters were the Mystery Guests on the May 29, 1955 airing of What's My Line? Fred Allen guessed who they were. In 1958, their mother appeared as a guest challenger on the television game show To Tell the Truth.  In December 1958 they appeared and performed as themselves in Season 4, Episode 11 of The Phil Silvers Show, "Bilko Presents the McGuire Sisters".

The McGuire Sisters and the Andrews Sisters met several times during their careers. Phyllis credited Patty, Maxene, and LaVerne Andrews during a television interview with Maxene in the 1990s, hosted by Sally Jessy Raphael, saying that her sisters and she  met the Andrews Sisters in New York in the early 1950s and received important advice. The McGuires moved when they sang, often executing dance routines in lavish production numbers on countless television specials. The Andrews Sisters performed similarly in films in the 1940s, and were the first female vocal group to move when they sang, rather than just standing at a microphone. The sisters had mimicked that style, as well as those of the Mills Brothers and the Dinning Sisters ever since they were young, when they would perform short shows for family and friends in their parents' living room. Phyllis McGuire recounted that she and her sisters did not know any popular songs when they became famous, only the hymns taught to them by their mother. The trio imitated other singing groups long before their success.

They performed for five Presidents of the United States: Richard Nixon, Gerald Ford, Jimmy Carter, Ronald Reagan, and George H. W. Bush, and for Queen Elizabeth II. In London they performed a set for the Royal Variety Performance of 1961.

During the 1960s, the sisters maintained a busy television schedule, making frequent appearances on popular variety programs hosted by Ed Sullivan, Dean Martin, Danny Kaye, Milton Berle, Andy Williams, Perry Como, and Red Skelton. The trio was dressed and coiffed identically, and performed synchronized body movements and hand gestures with military precision. Their recordings of "Sincerely", "Picnic", and "Sugartime" all sold more than one million copies.

End to the group's public appearances
They retired from public appearances in 1968, giving their last performance that year on The Ed Sullivan Show. Phyllis McGuire continued to perform solo for a time. The demise of the group is often attributed to Phyllis' long-standing personal relationship with mobster Sam Giancana (although for years she claimed that their friendship was strictly platonic), which reportedly led to the group's blacklisting.

During one of his 1960s court appearances for which Phyllis was subpoenaed, Giancana told reporters outside the courthouse, "Phyllis knows everything" about the rumored unethical behaviors of John F. Kennedy and his brother Robert. Giancana was shot in 1975 by an unknown gunman thought to be Dominic "Butch" Blasi, his closest confidant and right hand man of sorts.

Phyllis resided for decades in a famously showcased mansion in Las Vegas, boasting its own beauty parlor, a swan moat, and a replica of the Eiffel Tower which actually rose through the home's roof. When asked by Barbara Walters during a 1980s ABC-TV 20/20 interview from within the mansion if any of the money to build the lavish home came from Giancana, Phyllis denied the innuendo, claiming that she invested heavily in oil when the sisters were at the height of their popularity. In the same interview, she acknowledged that her relationship with Giancana was in fact a love affair, saying, "When I met him, I did not know who he was, and he was not married, and I was an unmarried woman. And according to the way I was brought up, there was nothing wrong with that. And I didn't find out until sometime later really who he was, and I was already in love."

The sisters reunited in 1986, performing at Toronto's Royal York Hotel for the first time since their retirement. Numerous nightclub engagements followed in Las Vegas, Atlantic City, and New York City's Rainbow & Stars, showcasing the group and Phyllis' impersonations of Peggy Lee, Judy Garland, Pearl Bailey, Ethel Merman, and even Louis Armstrong.

Singing their greatest hits as part of their act, they were also featured performing specialty numbers such as the frantic "I Love a Violin", the a cappella "Danny Boy", and a segment during which Phyllis retired backstage as Christine and Dorothy shared the spotlight playing a concert arrangement of "The Way We Were" on twin pianos. Other highlights in the act were a comical Trinidad-flavored tune, a soft rendering of "Memory" from Broadway's Cats, and a "Money Medley", which they also performed live on the Jerry Lewis MDA Telethon in 1994. Since then, the sisters had made occasional public appearances together, including in 2004, when they reunited to perform in a PBS special Magic Moments: Best of '50s Pop. The sisters' command of their vocal cords and harmonious blend, perhaps the most impressive of any trio before or since, had not significantly diminished.

After their careers wound down, they opened a restaurant in Bradenton, Florida, calling it McGuire's Pub.

Legacy
They were inducted into the National Broadcasting Hall of Fame in 1994, and in 2001, they were inducted into the Vocal Group Hall of Fame. They also have been inducted into the Coca-Cola Hall of Fame and the Headliners' Hall of Fame. They were inducted into the Hit Parade Hall of Fame in 2009.

Family
Christine was married six times. Her first marriage to Harold Ashcraft (1942 until August 16, 1950) she had two children, Herold and Asa. Christine later married John Henry Teeter (December 30, 1952 until December, 18, 1962), Robert Hugh Spain (December 12, 1967 until 1970), Guy Marks (from 1975 until unknown), George Rosenfeld (from ?? until his death on August 23, 1996), and David Mudd (2002 until his death on August 19, 2011). All the latter marriages remained childless.

Christine's grandson, Army Cpl. Evan Asa Ashcraft, aged 24, was killed in Iraq in 2003, when the convoy he was traveling in came under fire.

On July 30, 1951, Dorothy married Sgt. John Henry Brown, whom she divorced on January 9, 1956. During their childless marriage, Dorothy was romantically linked with singer Julius La Rosa. On December 6, 1958, she married Lowell James Williamson, with whom she had two sons, Rex and David.

In November 1952, Phyllis married Cornelius (Neal) Anthony Burke Van Ells. They divorced in 1956. She had no children.

Deaths
On September 7, 2012, Dorothy McGuire died at her son's home in Paradise Valley, Arizona, after suffering from Parkinson's disease and age-related dementia; she was 84. Dorothy's husband of 54 years, Lowell Williamson, died six months later on February 25, 2013, after sustaining a fractured back from a fall; he was 89.

Christine McGuire died in Las Vegas, Nevada, on December 28, 2018, at the age of 92. No cause of death was given.

Phyllis McGuire, the last surviving member of the trio, died peacefully at her estate in Las Vegas, Nevada, on December 29, 2020, of natural causes; she was 89.

Discography

Phyllis McGuire solo singles

In popular culture
The McGuire Sisters, and most especially Phyllis McGuire, who lived in Las Vegas, were the subjects of the 1995 HBO movie Sugartime, which depicted a romantic relationship between Phyllis and mobster Sam Giancana. Giancana was played by actor John Turturro, and Phyllis was played by actress Mary-Louise Parker.

The Robert Altman film Come Back to the Five and Dime Jimmy Dean (1982) prominently features the music of The McGuire Sisters. Their number one single, "Sincerely", is lip-synced by the film's stars Cher, Karen Black and Sandy Dennis as "The Disciples of James Dean."

"Join the Club", the second episode of the sixth season of The Sopranos, references both The McGuire Sisters and Sam Giancana.

References

External links
 McGuire Sisters' page on the National Broadcasters Hall of Fame (NBHF) site
 McGuire Sisters' page on the Primarily A Cappella site
 McGuire Sisters' page on the Vocal Group Hall of Fame site
 Cincinnati Enquirer article on the sisters' home
 
 
 
 
 
 McGuire Sisters recordings at the Discography of American Historical Recordings

American women singers
American pop music groups
Coral Records artists
Deaths from Parkinson's disease
Family musical groups
American girl groups
Members of the Church of God (Anderson, Indiana)
Musical groups established in 1952
Musical groups disestablished in 1968
Musical groups from Ohio
People from Miamisburg, Ohio
People from Middletown, Ohio
1952 establishments in Ohio
1968 disestablishments in Ohio
Sibling musical trios
Traditional pop music singers
Vocal trios
20th-century American singers